Joseph Robert Hilton (born 11 October 1999) is an English professional footballer who plays for Blackburn Rovers, as a goalkeeper.

Career
Hilton began his career with the youth teams of Manchester City and Everton, also spending time in non-league on loan at Marine, for whom he made 18 appearances in all competitions.

After leaving Everton he signed a two-year contract with Blackburn Rovers in July 2019, moving on an emergency 7 day loan to Fleetwood Town on 12 January 2021. He made his professional debut in the EFL Trophy on 12 January 2021, and his Football League debut on 16 January 2021. He returned to Blackburn after the 7 days ended, having made 3 appearances for Fleetwood. On 27 January 2021, after signing a new one-year contract extension with Blackburn, he headed out on loan once more, this time joining Scottish Premiership side Ross County until the end of the season. On 28 June 2021 Hilton joined Hamilton Academical on loan.

References

1999 births
Living people
English footballers
Manchester City F.C. players
Everton F.C. players
Marine F.C. players
Blackburn Rovers F.C. players
Fleetwood Town F.C. players
Association football goalkeepers
English Football League players
Northern Premier League players
Ross County F.C. players
Hamilton Academical F.C. players
Scottish Professional Football League players